Berth Hill is an Iron Age hillfort in Staffordshire, England, about  south-west of Newcastle-under-Lyme, and near the village of Maer. It is a scheduled monument. Other forms of its name have been Bryth, Bruff and Burgh Hill.

Description
The fort is on a sandstone outcrop at the south-east edge of Maer Hills. The defences, following the contours of the hill, have an irregular shape.

In the north, the slope is less steep than elsewhere, and there is a second rampart outside this, width . There are two original entrances: an inturned entrance in the south-west, and an entrance at the north end of the east defences. There is a spring on the eastern side of the interior.

Excavations
Results of excavations in 1966 and 1975 have been interpreted as showing an early period of occupation, followed by a long interval of disuse (suggested by ditches containing silt and parts of collapsed rampart), and later a hurried reconstruction of the defences.

Nineteenth-century changes
Josiah Wedgwood II, owner of Maer Hall in the early 19th century, built an aqueduct to pipe water from the spring to the Hall and the village of Maer. This, with associated damage to the inner rampart, remains visible on the east side of the hill.

Part of the site, mainly in the north and east, was adapted in the 19th century to be an ornamental landscape: there are garden walks, and a zig-zag path leading to a small platform, thought to be a viewing area.

See also
 Hillforts in Britain

References

Hill forts in Staffordshire
Scheduled monuments in Staffordshire
Borough of Newcastle-under-Lyme